The İstanbul Cup (also known as the TEB BNP Paribas Tennis Championship İstanbul for sponsorship reasons) is a WTA tennis tournament held in Istanbul, Turkey, organised for professional female tennis players. It is classified as an International-level tournament on the WTA Tour. Held annually since May 2005, it was played on outdoor clay courts until 2009, after which the organisers decided to switch the surface to outdoor hard courts. It was not held in between 2011–2013, due to the WTA Tour Championships moving to Istanbul for those years. It resumed for the 2014 WTA season. In 2016, the tournament surface was changed back to clay. It is currently played at the TTF Istanbul Tennis Center, located in the İstinye neighborhood.

Past finals

Singles

Doubles

See also
 Istanbul Open – men's tournament (2015–2018)
 List of tennis tournaments

External links
Official site

 
Tennis tournaments in Turkey
Clay court tennis tournaments
WTA Tour
Sport in Istanbul
International sports competitions hosted by Turkey
Recurring sporting events established in 2005
2005 establishments in Turkey
Spring (season) events in Turkey